Crandall Farm Complex is a historic home and farm complex located at Cazenovia in Madison County, New York.  The frame farmhouse was built about 1870 and is a two-story, frame residence in the vernacular Italianate style. Also on the property are two barns, carriage house, privy, shed, and cobblestone well house.

It was added to the National Register of Historic Places in 1987.

References

Houses on the National Register of Historic Places in New York (state)
Federal architecture in New York (state)
Italianate architecture in New York (state)
Houses completed in 1870
Houses in Madison County, New York
National Register of Historic Places in Cazenovia, New York